, nicknamed "", is a Japanese professional baseball infielder for the Saitama Seibu Lions in Japan's Nippon Professional Baseball.

He was selected . On October 10, 2018, he was selected Japan national baseball team at the 2018 MLB Japan All-Star Series.

References

External links

NPB.com
NPB.jp

1991 births
Living people
Baseball people from Okinawa Prefecture
Japanese baseball players
Nippon Professional Baseball first basemen
Saitama Seibu Lions players
Nippon Professional Baseball MVP Award winners
2023 World Baseball Classic players